Mayan World Airlines was an airline based in Guatemala.

Code data 

 ICAO Code: MYN
 Call-sign: Mayan World
 2-letter code: EY

Fleet 

As of August 2006, the Mayan World Airlines fleet included:

1 Yakovlev Yak-40
1 ATR 42-300

Destinations

As of November 1999 Mayan World Airlines flew to:

Cancun
Guatemala City
Flores(Guatemala)

References 

Defunct airlines of Guatemala
Airlines established in 1996
Airlines disestablished in 1999